Luther Greene was an American theatrical producer and landscaper. He was also active in landscaping business and designed rooftop gardens countrywide.

Personal life 
He was born in Virginia and received his education the University of Virginia.

He married an actress, Judith Anderson.

Career 
Greene started his career as a producer with a play, Ghosts, starring, Alla Nazimova.

In June 1987, he died at the age of 78.

Filmography 
 Farewell to Manzanar (1976)
 Hardware Wars (1978)
 Dim Sum - A Little Bit of Heart (1985)
 Mark Twain'' (1985)

References 

1987 deaths
American producers
University of Virginia alumni